Yongning Subdistrict is a subdistrict under the administration of Wenjiang District, Chengdu, Sichuan, China. Yongning administers 5 residential communities and 105 administrative neighborhoods.

The subdistrict spans an area of 23.5 square kilometres and has a registered population of approximately 24,000. Located in the northeast of Wenjiang District, the subdistrict lies approximately 10 kilometers away from the city centre of Chengdu.

References

Township-level divisions of Sichuan
Geography of Chengdu